Hoegen is a surname. Notable people with the surname include:

Egon Hoegen (1928–2018), German actor and off-camera voice artist
Gustav Hoegen, Dutch animatronic designer/ creature FX artist